LÉ Orla (P41) was a  in the Irish Naval Service. Like the rest of her class, she was originally designed for use by the British Royal Navy in Hong Kong waters, and was delivered in 1985 by Hall, Russell & Company as HMS Swift (P243).

"Long Éireannach" (LÉ), Irish for "Irish ship", is the designation given to ships in the Irish Naval Service's fleet. The ship was named after Orla, a grand niece (great niece) of Brian Boru who was murdered by her husband around 1090. The crest shows the arms of Clare on the top segment and a sword and royal collar on the base.

Specifications
Orla has a displacement of 712 tons fully loaded. The ship was launched in 1984 and purchased by the Irish government in 1988. She carries a crew of 39, including six officers. She is armed with one 76 mm/62 OTO Melara compact gun; two 20 mm Rh202 Rheinmetall weapons and four 12.7mm heavy machine-guns.

History
In November 2008, LÉ Orla assisted in Operation Seabight which resulted in the largest seizure of cocaine in the history of the state.

In mid-2014, LÉ Orla was temporarily kept out of commission to facilitate the removal of asbestos which had been discovered on the ship.

References

External links
IDF LÉ Orla webpage

1985 ships
1997 in Hong Kong
Ships built by Hall, Russell & Company
Naval ships of the Republic of Ireland
Peacock-class corvettes of the Irish Naval Service
Peacock-class corvettes